Kia Deh (also Romanized as Kīā Deh) is a village in Kuhpayeh-e Gharbi Rural District, in the Central District of Abyek County, Qazvin Province, Iran. In the 2006 census, its population was 66.

References 

Populated places in Abyek County